are Brazilian citizens who are nationals or naturals of Japanese ancestry or Japanese immigrants living in Brazil or Japanese people of Brazilian ancestry.

The first group of Japanese immigrants arrived in Brazil in 1908. Brazil is home to the largest Japanese population outside Japan. Since the 1980s, a return migration has emerged of Japanese Brazilians to Japan. More recently, a trend of interracial marriage has taken hold among Brazilians of Japanese descent, with the racial intermarriage rate approximated at 50% and increasing.

History

Background 

Between the end of the 19th and early 20th centuries, coffee was the main export product of Brazil. At first, Brazilian farmers used African slave labour in the coffee plantations, but in 1850, the slave trade was abolished in Brazil. To solve the labour shortage, the Brazilian elite decided to attract European immigrants to work on the coffee plantations. This was also consistent with the government's push towards "whitening" the country. The hope was that through procreation the large African and Native American groups would be eliminated or reduced. The government and farmers offered to pay European immigrants' passage. The plan encouraged millions of Europeans, most of them Italians, to migrate to Brazil. However, once in Brazil, the immigrants received very low salaries and worked in poor conditions, including long working hours and frequent ill-treatment by their bosses. Because of this, in 1902, Italy enacted , prohibiting subsidized emigration to Brazil.

The end of feudalism in Japan generated great poverty in the rural population, so many Japanese began to emigrate in search of better living conditions. By the 1930s, Japanese industrialisation had significantly boosted the population. However, prospects for Japanese people to migrate to other countries were limited. The US had banned non-white immigration from some parts of the world on the basis that they would not integrate into society; this Exclusion Clause, of the 1924 Immigration Act, specifically targeted the Japanese. At the same time in Australia, the White Australia Policy prevented the immigration of non-whites to Australia.

First immigrants 

In 1907, the Brazilian and the Japanese governments signed a treaty permitting Japanese migration to Brazil. This was due in part to the decrease in the Italian immigration to Brazil and a new labour shortage on the coffee plantations. Also, Japanese immigration to the United States had been barred by the Gentlemen's Agreement of 1907. About half of these immigrants came from southern Okinawa. They travelled from the Japanese port of Kobe via the Cape of Good Hope in South Africa. Many of them became owners of coffee plantations.

In the first seven years, 3,434 more Japanese families (14,983 people) arrived. The beginning of World War I in 1914 started a boom in Japanese migration to Brazil; such that between 1917 and 1940 over 164,000 Japanese came to Brazil, 75% of them going to São Paulo, where most of the coffee plantations were located.

New life in Brazil 
The vast majority of Japanese immigrants intended to work a few years in Brazil, make some money, and go home. However, "getting rich quick" was a dream that was almost impossible to achieve. This was exacerbated by the fact that it was obligatory for Japanese immigrants to Brazil prior to the Second World War to emigrate in familial units. Because multiple persons necessitated monetary support in these familial units, Japanese immigrants found it nearly impossible to return home to Japan even years after emigrating to Brazil. The immigrants were paid a very low salary and worked long hours of exhausting work. Also, everything that the immigrants consumed had to be purchased from the landowner (see truck system). Soon, their debts became very significant.

The land owners in Brazil still had a slavery mentality. Immigrants, although employees, had to confront the rigidity and lack of labour laws. Suicide,  (to escape at night), and strikes were some of the attitudes taken by many Japanese because of the exploitation on coffee farms.

The barrier of language, religion, dietary habits, clothing, lifestyles and differences in climate entailed a culture shock. Many immigrants tried to return to Japan but were prevented by Brazilian farmers, who required them to comply with the contract and work with the coffee. Even when they were free of their contractual obligations on Brazil’s coffee plantations, it was often impossible for immigrants to return home due to their meager earnings. Many Japanese immigrants purchased land in rural Brazil instead, having been forced to invest what little capital they had into land in order to someday make enough to return to Japan. As independent farmers, Japanese immigrants formed communities that were ethnically-isolated from the rest of Brazilian society.

On 1 August 1908, The New York Times remarked that relations between Brazil and Japan at the time were "not extremely cordial", because of "the attitude of Brazil toward the immigration of Japanese labourers."

Japanese children born in Brazil were educated in schools founded by the Japanese community. Most only learned to speak the Japanese language and lived within the Japanese community in rural areas. Over the years, many Japanese managed to buy their own land and became small farmers. They started to plant strawberries, tea and rice. Only 6% of children were the result of interracial relationships. Immigrants rarely accepted marriage with a non-Japanese person.

By the 1930s, Brazilians complained that the independent Japanese communities had formed , or “racial cysts”, and were unwilling to further integrate the Japanese Brazilians into Brazilian society. The Japanese government, via the Japanese consulate in São Paulo, was directly involved with the education of Japanese children in Brazil. Japanese education in Brazil was modeled after education systems in Japan, and schools in Japanese communities in Brazil received funding directly from the Japanese government. By 1933, there were 140,000-150,000 Japanese Brazilians, which was by far the largest Japanese population in any Latin American country.

With Brazil under the leadership of Getúlio Vargas and the Empire of Japan involved on the Axis side in World War II, Japanese Brazilians became more isolated from their mother country. Japanese leaders and diplomats in Brazil left for Japan after Brazil severed all relations with Japan on 29 January 1942, leading Japanese Brazilians to fend for themselves in an increasingly-hostile country. Vargas’s regime instituted several measures that targeted the Japanese population in Brazil, including the loss of freedom to travel within Brazil, censorship of Japanese newspapers (even those printed in Portuguese), and imprisonment if Japanese Brazilians were caught speaking Japanese in public. Japanese Brazilians became divided amongst themselves, and some even turned to performing terrorist acts on Japanese farmers who were employed by Brazilian farmers. By 1947, however, following the end of World War II, tensions between Brazilians and their Japanese population had cooled considerably. Japanese-language newspapers returned to publication and Japanese-language education was reinstituted among the Japanese Brazilian population. World War II had left Japanese Brazilians isolated from their mother country, censored by the Brazilian government, and facing internal conflicts within their own populations, but, for the most part, life returned to normal following the end of the war.

Prejudice and forced assimilation 
On 28 July 1921, representatives Andrade Bezerra and Cincinato Braga proposed a law whose Article 1 provided: "The immigration of individuals from the black race to Brazil is prohibited." On 22 October 1923, representative Fidélis Reis produced another bill on the entry of immigrants, whose fifth article was as follows: "The entry of settlers from the black race into Brazil is prohibited. For Asian [immigrants] there will be allowed each year a number equal to 5% of those residing in the country..."

Some years before World War II, the government of President Getúlio Vargas initiated a process of forced assimilation of people of immigrant origin in Brazil. The Constitution of 1934 had a legal provision about the subject: "The concentration of immigrants anywhere in the country is prohibited, the law should govern the selection, location and assimilation of the alien". The assimilationist project affected mainly 
Japanese, Italian, Jewish, and German immigrants and their descendants.

In the government's conception, the non-White population of Brazil should disappear within the dominant class of Portuguese Brazilian origin. This way, the mixed-race population should be "whitened" through selective mixing, then a preference for European immigration. In consequence, the non-white population would, gradually, achieve a desirable White phenotype. The government focused on Italians, Jews, and Japanese. The formation of "ethnic cysts" among immigrants of non-Portuguese origin prevented the realization of the whitening project of the Brazilian population. The government, then, started to act on these communities of foreign origin to force them to integrate into a "Brazilian culture" with Portuguese roots. It was the dominant idea of a unification of all the inhabitants of Brazil under a single "national spirit". During World War II, Brazil severed relations with Japan. Japanese newspapers and teaching the Japanese language in schools were banned, leaving Portuguese as the only option for Japanese descendants. Newspapers in Italian or German were also advised to cease production, as Italy and Germany were Japan's allies in the war. In 1939, research of Estrada de Ferro Noroeste do Brasil, from São Paulo, showed that 87.7% of Japanese Brazilians read newspapers in the Japanese language, a high figure for a country with many illiterate people like Brazil at the time.

The Japanese appeared as undesirable immigrants within the "whitening" and assimilationist policy of the Brazilian government. Oliveira Viana, a Brazilian jurist, historian and sociologist described the Japanese immigrants as follows: "They (Japanese) are like sulfur: insoluble". The Brazilian magazine "O Malho" in its edition of 5 December 1908 issued a charge of Japanese immigrants with the following legend: "The government of São Paulo is stubborn. After the failure of the first Japanese immigration, it contracted 3,000 yellow people. It insists on giving Brazil a race diametrically opposite to ours". In 1941, the Brazilian Minister of Justice, Francisco Campos, defended the ban on admission of 400 Japanese immigrants in São Paulo and wrote: "their despicable standard of living is a brutal competition with the country’s worker; their selfishness, their bad faith, their refractory character, make them a huge ethnic and cultural cyst located in the richest regions of Brazil".

The Japanese Brazilian community was strongly marked by restrictive measures when Brazil declared war against Japan in August 1942. Japanese Brazilians could not travel the country without safe conduct issued by the police; over 200 Japanese schools were closed and radio equipment was seized to prevent transmissions on short wave from Japan. The goods of Japanese companies were confiscated and several companies of Japanese origin had interventions, including the newly founded Banco América do Sul. Japanese Brazilians were prohibited from driving motor vehicles (even if they were taxi drivers), buses or trucks on their property. The drivers employed by Japanese had to have permission from the police. Thousands of Japanese immigrants were arrested or expelled from Brazil on suspicion of espionage. There were many anonymous denunciations of "activities against national security" arising from disagreements between neighbors, recovery of debts and even fights between children. Japanese Brazilians were arrested for "suspicious activity" when they were in artistic meetings or picnics. On 10 July 1943, approximately 10,000 Japanese and German and Italian immigrants who lived in Santos had 24 hours to close their homes and businesses and move away from the Brazilian coast. The police acted without any notice. About 90% of people displaced were Japanese. To reside in Baixada Santista, the Japanese had to have a safe conduct. In 1942, the Japanese community who introduced the cultivation of pepper in Tomé-Açu, in Pará, was virtually turned into a "concentration camp". This time, the Brazilian ambassador in Washington, D.C., Carlos Martins Pereira e Sousa, encouraged the government of Brazil to transfer all the Japanese Brazilians to "internment camps" without the need for legal support, in the same manner as was done with the Japanese residents in the United States. No single suspicion of activities of Japanese against "national security" was confirmed.

During the National Constituent Assembly of 1946, the representative of Rio de Janeiro Miguel Couto Filho proposed Amendments to the Constitution as follows: "It is prohibited the entry of Japanese immigrants of any age and any origin in the country". In the final vote, a tie with 99 votes in favour and 99 against. Senator Fernando de Melo Viana, who chaired the session of the Constituent Assembly, had the casting vote and rejected the constitutional amendment. By only one vote, the immigration of Japanese people to Brazil was not prohibited by the Brazilian Constitution of 1946.

The Japanese immigrants appeared to the Brazilian government as undesirable and non-assimilable immigrants. As Asian, they did not contribute to the "whitening" process of the Brazilian people as desired by the ruling Brazilian elite. In this process of forced assimilation the Japanese, more than any other immigrant group, suffered the ethno-cultural persecution imposed during this period.

Prestige 
For decades, Japanese Brazilians were seen as a non-assimilable people. The immigrants were treated only as a reserve of cheap labour that should be used on coffee plantations and that Brazil should avoid absorbing their cultural influences. This widespread conception that the Japanese were negative for Brazil was changed in the following decades. The Japanese were able to overcome the difficulties along the years and drastically improve their lives through hard work and education; this was also facilitated by the involvement of the Japanese government in the process of migration. The image of hard working agriculturists that came to help develop the country and agriculture helped erase the lack of trust of the local population and create a positive image of the Japanese. In the 1970s, Japan became one of the richest countries of the world, synonymous with modernity and progress. In the same period, Japanese Brazilians achieved a great cultural and economic success, probably the immigrant group that most rapidly achieved progress in Brazil. Due to the powerful Japanese economy and due to the rapid enrichment of the Nisei, in the last decades Brazilians of Japanese descent achieved a social prestige in Brazil that largely contrasts with the aggression with which the early immigrants were treated in the country.

Integration and intermarriage 

As of 2008, many Japanese Brazilians belong to the third generation (sansei), who make up 41.33% of the community. First generation (issei) are 12.51%, second generation (nisei) are 30.85% and fourth generation (yonsei) 12.95%.

A more recent phenomenon in Brazil is intermarriages between Japanese Brazilians and non-ethnic Japanese. Though people of Japanese descent make up only 0.8% of the country's population, they are the largest Japanese community outside Japan, with over 1.4 million people. In areas with large numbers of Japanese, such as São Paulo and Paraná, since the 1970s, large numbers of Japanese descendants started to marry into other ethnic groups. Jeffrey Lesser's work has shown the complexities of integration both during the Vargas era, and more recently during the dictatorship (1964–1984)

Nowadays, among the 1.4 million Brazilians of Japanese descent, 28% have some non-Japanese ancestry. This number reaches only 6% among children of Japanese immigrants, but 61% among great-grandchildren of Japanese immigrants.

Religion 
Immigrants, as well as most Japanese, were mostly followers of Shinto and Buddhism. In the Japanese communities in Brazil, there was a strong effort by Brazilian priests to proselytize the Japanese. More recently, intermarriage with Catholics also contributed to the growth of Catholicism in the community. Currently, 60% of Japanese-Brazilians are Roman Catholics and 25% are adherents of a Japanese religion.

Martial arts 
The Japanese immigration to Brazil, in particular the immigration of the judoka Mitsuyo Maeda, resulted in the development of one of the most effective modern martial arts, Brazilian Jiu-Jitsu. Japanese immigrants also brought sumo wrestling to Brazil, with the first tournament in the country organized in 1914. The country has a growing number of amateur sumo wrestlers, with the only purpose-built sumo arena outside Japan located in São Paulo. Brazil also produced (as of January 2022) sixteen professional wrestlers, with the most successful being Kaisei Ichirō.

Language 

The knowledge of the Japanese and Portuguese languages reflects the integration of the Japanese in Brazil over several generations. Although first generation immigrants will often not learn Portuguese well or not use it frequently, most second generation are bilingual. The third generation, however, are most likely monolingual in Portuguese or speak, along with Portuguese, non-fluent Japanese.

A study conducted in the Japanese Brazilian communities of Aliança and Fukuhaku, both in the state of São Paulo, released information on the language spoken by these people. Before coming to Brazil, 12.2% of the first generation interviewed from Aliança reported they had studied the Portuguese language in Japan, and 26.8% said to have used it once on arrival in Brazil. Many of the Japanese immigrants took classes of Portuguese and learned about the history of Brazil before migrating to the country. In Fukuhaku only 7.7% of the people reported they had studied Portuguese in Japan, but 38.5% said they had contact with Portuguese once on arrival in Brazil. All the immigrants reported they spoke exclusively Japanese at home in the first years in Brazil. However, in 2003, the figure dropped to 58.5% in Aliança and 33.3% in Fukuhaku. This probably reflects that through contact with the younger generations of the family, who speak mostly Portuguese, many immigrants also began to speak Portuguese at home.

The first Brazilian-born generation, the Nisei, alternate between the use of Portuguese and Japanese. Regarding the use of Japanese at home, 64.3% of Nisei informants from Aliança and 41.5% from Fukuhaku used Japanese when they were children. In comparison, only 14.3% of the third generation, Sansei, reported to speak Japanese at home when they were children. It reflects that the second generation was mostly educated by their Japanese parents using the Japanese language. On the other hand, the third generation did not have much contact with their grandparent's language, and most of them speak the national language of Brazil, Portuguese, as their mother tongue.

Japanese Brazilians usually speak Japanese more often when they live along with a first generation relative. Those who do not live with a Japanese-born relative usually speak Portuguese more often. Japanese spoken in Brazil is usually a mix of different Japanese dialects, since the Japanese community in Brazil came from all regions of Japan, influenced by the Portuguese language. The high numbers of Brazilian immigrants returning from Japan will probably produce more Japanese speakers in Brazil.

Distribution and population 

In 2008, IBGE published a book about the Japanese diaspora and it estimated that, as of 2000 there were 70,932 Japanese-born immigrants living in Brazil (compared to the 158,087 found in 1970). Of the Japanese, 51,445 lived in São Paulo. Most of the immigrants were over 60 years old, because the Japanese immigration to Brazil has ended since the mid-20th century.

According to the IBGE, as of 2000, there were 1,435,490 people of Japanese descent in Brazil. The Japanese immigration was concentrated to São Paulo and, still in 2000, 48% of Japanese Brazilians lived in this state. There were 693,495 people of Japanese origin in São Paulo, followed by Paraná with 143,588. More recently, Brazilians of Japanese descent are making presence in places that used to have a small population of this group. For example: in 1960, there were 532 Japanese Brazilians in Bahia, while in 2000 they were 78,449, or 0.6% of the state's population. Northern Brazil (excluding Pará) saw its Japanese population increase from 2,341 in 1960 (0.2% of the total population) to 54,161 (0.8%) in 2000. During the same period, in Central-Western Brazil they increased from 3,583 to 66,119 (0.7% of the population). However, the overall Japanese population in Brazil is shrinking, secondary to a decreased birth rate and an aging population; return immigration to Japan, as well as intermarriage with other races and dilution of ethnic identity.

For the whole Brazil, with over 1.4 million people of Japanese descent, the largest percentages were found in the states of São Paulo (1.9% of Japanese descent), Paraná (1.5%) and Mato Grosso do Sul (1.4%). The smallest percentages were found in Roraima and Alagoas (with only 8 Japanese). The percentage of Brazilians with Japanese roots largely increased among children and teenagers. In 1991, 0.6% of Brazilians between 0 and 14 years old were of Japanese descent. In 2000, they were 4%, as a result of the returning of Dekasegis (Brazilians of Japanese descent who work in Japan) to Brazil.

Image gallery

Japanese from Maringá 
A 2008 census revealed details about the population of Japanese origin from the city of Maringá in Paraná, making it possible to have a profile of the Japanese-Brazilian population.

Numbers
There were 4,034 families of Japanese descent from Maringá, comprising 14,324 people.

Dekasegi
1,846 or 15% of Japanese Brazilians from Maringá were working in Japan.

Generations
Of the 12,478 people of Japanese origin living in Maringá, 6.61% were Issei (born in Japan); 35.45% were Nisei (children of Japanese); 37.72% were Sansei (grandchildren) and 13.79% were Yonsei (great-grandchildren).

Average age
The average age was of 40.12 years old

Gender
52% of Japanese Brazilians from the city were women.

Average number of children per woman
2.4 children (similar to the average Southern Brazilian woman)

Religion

Most were Roman Catholics (32% of Sansei, 27% of Nisei, 10% of Yonsei and 2% of Issei). Protestant religions were the second most followed (6% of Nisei, 6% of Sansei, 2% of Yonsei and 1% of Issei) and next was Buddhism (5% of Nisei, 3% of Issei, 2% of Sansei and 1% of Yonsei).

Family
49.66% were married.

Knowledge of the Japanese language
47% can understand, read and write in Japanese. 31% of the second generation and 16% of the third generation can speak Japanese.

Schooling
31% elementary education; 30% secondary school and 30% higher education.

Mixed-race
A total of 20% were mixed-race (have some non-Japanese origin).

The Dekasegi 

During the 1980s, the Japanese economic situation improved and achieved stability. Many Japanese Brazilians went to Japan as contract workers due to economic and political problems in Brazil, and they were termed "Dekasegi". Working visas were offered to Brazilian Dekasegis in 1990, encouraging more immigration from Brazil.

In 1990, the Japanese government authorized the legal entry of Japanese and their descendants until the third generation in Japan. At that time, Japan was receiving a large number of illegal immigrants from Pakistan, Bangladesh, China, and Thailand. The legislation of 1990 was intended to select immigrants who entered Japan, giving a clear preference for Japanese descendants from South America, especially Brazil. These people were lured to Japan to work in areas that the Japanese refused (the so-called "three K": ,  and  – hard, dirty and dangerous). Many Japanese Brazilians began to immigrate. The influx of Japanese descendants from Brazil to Japan was and continues to be large: there are over 300,000 Brazilians living in Japan today, mainly as workers in factories.

Because of their Japanese ancestry, the Japanese Government believed that Brazilians would be more easily integrated into Japanese society. In fact, this easy integration did not happen, since Japanese Brazilians and their children born in Japan are treated as foreigners by native Japanese. This apparent contradiction between being and seeming causes conflicts of adaptation for the migrants and their acceptance by the natives.

They also constitute the largest number of Portuguese speakers in Asia, greater than those of formerly Portuguese East Timor, Macau and Goa combined. Likewise, Brazil, alongside the Japanese American population of the United States, maintains its status as home to the largest Japanese community outside Japan.

Cities and prefectures with the most Brazilians in Japan are: Hamamatsu, Aichi, Shizuoka, Kanagawa, Saitama, and Gunma. Brazilians in Japan are usually educated. However, they are employed in the Japanese automotive and electronics factories. Most Brazilians go to Japan attracted by the recruiting agencies (legal or illegal) in conjunction with the factories. Many Brazilians are subjected to hours of exhausting work, earning a small salary by Japanese standards. Nevertheless, in 2002, Brazilians living in Japan sent US$2.5 billion to Brazil.

Due to the financial crisis of 2007–2010, many Brazilians returned from Japan to Brazil. From January 2011 to March, it is estimated that 20,000 Brazilian immigrants left Japan.

Brazilian identity in Japan 
In Japan, many Japanese Brazilians suffer prejudice because they do not know how to speak Japanese fluently. Despite their Japanese appearance, Brazilians in Japan are culturally Brazilians, usually only speaking Portuguese, and are treated as foreigners.

The children of  Brazilians encounter difficulties in Japanese schools. Thousands of Brazilian children are out of school in Japan.

The Brazilian influence in Japan is growing. Tokyo has the largest carnival parade outside of Brazil itself. Portuguese is the third most spoken foreign language in Japan, after Chinese and Korean, and is among the most studied languages by students in the country. In Oizumi, it is estimated that 15% of the population speak Portuguese as their native language. Japan has two newspapers in the Portuguese language, besides radio and television stations spoken in that language. The Brazilian fashion and Bossa Nova music are also popular among Japanese. In 2005, there were an estimated 302,000 Brazilian nationals in Japan, of whom 25,000 also hold Japanese citizenship.

100th anniversary 
In 2008, many celebrations took place in Japan and Brazil to remember the centenary of Japanese immigration. Prince Naruhito of Japan arrived in Brazil on 17 June to participate in the celebrations. He visited Brasília, São Paulo, Paraná, Minas Gerais and Rio de Janeiro. Throughout his stay in Brazil, the Prince was received by a crowd of Japanese immigrants and their descendants. He broke the protocol of the Japanese Monarchy, which prohibits physical contact with people, and greeted the Brazilian people. In the São Paulo sambódromo, the Prince spoke to 50,000 people and in Paraná to 75,000. He also visited the University of São Paulo, where people of Japanese descent make up 14% of the 80,000 students. Naruhito, the crown prince of Japan, gave a speech in Portuguese.

Media 
In São Paulo there are two Japanese publications, the São Paulo Shimbun and the Nikkey Shimbun. The former was established in 1946 and the latter was established in 1998.

The Nambei, published in 1916, was Brazil's first Japanese newspaper. In 1933 90% of East Asian-origin Brazilians read Japanese publications, including 20 periodicals, 15 magazines, and five newspapers. The increase of the number of publications was due to Japanese immigration to Brazil. The government banned publication of Japanese newspapers during World War II.

All were published in São Paulo.

Education 

Japanese international day schools in Brazil include the Escola Japonesa de São Paulo ("São Paulo Japanese School"), the Associação Civil de Divulgação Cultural e Educacional Japonesa do Rio de Janeiro in the Cosme Velho neighborhood of Rio de Janeiro, and the Escola Japonesa de Manaus. The Escola Japonesa de Belo Horizonte (ベロ・オリゾンテ日本人学校), and Japanese schools in Belém and Vitória previously existed; all three closed, and their certifications by the Japanese education ministry (MEXT) were revoked on March 29, 2002 (Heisei 14).

There are also supplementary schools teaching the Japanese language and culture. As of 2003, in southern Brazil there are hundreds of Japanese supplementary schools. The Japan Foundation in São Paulo's coordinator of projects in 2003 stated that São Paulo State has about 500 supplementary schools. Around 33% of the Japanese supplementary schools in southeastern Brazil are in the city of São Paulo. As of 2003 almost all of the directors of the São Paulo schools were women.

MEXT recognizes one part-time Japanese school (hoshu jugyo ko or hoshuko), the Escola Suplementar Japonesa Curitiba in Curitiba. MEXT-approved hoshukos in Porto Alegre and Salvador have closed.

History of education 
The Taisho School, Brazil's first Japanese language school, opened in 1915 in São Paulo. In some areas full-time Japanese schools opened because no local schools existed in the vicinity of the Japanese settlements. In 1932 over 10,000 Nikkei Brazilian children attended almost 200 Japanese supplementary schools in São Paulo. By 1938 Brazil had a total of 600 Japanese schools.

In 1970, 22,000 students, taught by 400 teachers, attended 350 supplementary Japanese schools. In 1992 there were 319 supplementary Japanese language schools in Brazil with a total of 18,782 students, 10,050 of them being female and 8,732 of them being male. Of the schools, 111 were in São Paulo State and 54 were in Paraná State. At the time, the São Paulo Metropolitan Area had 95 Japanese schools, and the schools in the city limits of São Paulo had 6,916 students.

In the 1980s, São Paulo Japanese supplementary schools were larger than those in other communities. In general, during that decade a Brazilian supplementary Japanese school had one or two teachers responsible for around 60 students.

Hiromi Shibata, a PhD student at the University of São Paulo, wrote the dissertation , published in 1997. Jeff Lesser, author of Negotiating National Identity: Immigrants, Minorities, and the Struggle for Ethnicity in Brazil, wrote that the author "suggests" that the Japanese schools in São Paulo "were as much an affirmation of Nipo-Brazilian identity as they were of Japanese nationalism."

Notable persons

Arts 
 Erica Awano, artist and author
 Roger Cruz, comic book artist
 Fabio Ide, actor and model
 Yuu Kamiya, manga artist and novelist
 Daniel Matsunaga, actor, and model
 Lovefoxxx (Luísa Hanae Matsushita), lead singer of CSS
 Carol Nakamura, model and actress
 Ruy Ohtake, architect
 Tikashi Fukushima, artist (originally from Sōma, Japan)
 Tomie Ohtake, artist (Originally from Kyoto, Japan)
 Oscar Oiwa, artist
 Leandro Okabe, model
 Lisa Ono, singer
 Ryot (Ricardo Tokumoto), cartoonist
 Akihiro Sato, actor and model
 Sabrina Sato, model and TV host
 Daniele Suzuki, actress and TV host
 Fernanda Takai, lead singer of Pato Fu
 Carlos Toshiki (Carlos Toshiki Takahashi), singer-songwriter
 Luana Tanaka, actress
 Tizuka Yamasaki, film director
 Mateus Asato, musician

Business 
 Teruaki Yamagishi, businessman and management consultant (Originally from Tokyo, Japan)

Politics 
 Luiz Gushiken, former minister of communications
 Newton Ishii, Federal Police agent
 Kim Kataguiri, organizer of the Free Brazil Movement
 Juniti Saito, former commander of the Brazilian Air Force

Religious 
 Júlio Endi Akamine, Roman Catholic archbishop
 Hidekazu Takayama, Assemblies of God pastor and politician

Sports 
 Luís Oyama, footballer
Gabriel Kazu, footballer (Originally from Seki, Gifu, Japan)
 Sérgio Echigo, former footballer
 Sandro Hiroshi, former footballer
 Wagner Lopes, former footballer
 Ruy Ramos, former footballer
 Kazuyoshi Miura, footballer (who holds his Brazilian citizenship since the 1980s) - Originally from Shizuoka, Shizuoka, Japan
 Hugo Hoyama, table tennis player
 Vânia Ishii, judo wrestler
 Caio Japa, futsal player
 Kaisei Ichiro, sumo wrestler
 Stefannie Arissa Koyama, judoka (Originally from Gunma, Japan)
 Pedro Ken, footballer
 Bruna Leal, 2012 London Olympics gymnast
 Lyoto Machida, mixed martial arts fighter, karateka, former sumo wrestler and the former Ultimate Fighting Championship light-heavyweight champion
 Mario Yamasaki, mixed martial arts referee, jiu-jitsu practitioner
 Shigueto Yamasaki, judoka at 1992 Olympics
 Goiti Yamauchi, mixed martial arts fighter, Bellator Fighter (Originally from Anjō, Aichi, Japan)
 Scott MacKenzie, darts player
 Mitsuyo Maeda, judo wrestler (Originally from Hirosaki, Aomori, Japan)
 Arthur Mariano, 2016 Rio Olympics gymnast
 Andrews Nakahara, mixed martial arts fighter and karateka
 Paulo Miyao, Brazilian jiu-jitsu competitor
 Paulo Miyashiro, triathlete
 Paulo Nagamura, footballer
 Mariana Ohata, triathlete
 Tetsuo Okamoto, former swimmer
 Poliana Okimoto, long-distance swimmer
 Noguchi Pinto, footballer
 Rogério Romero, former swimmer
 Lucas Salatta, swimmer
 Sérgio Sasaki, Rio 2016 Olympic gymnast
 Manabu Suzuki, former racing driver turned car magazine writer and motorsport announcer (Originally from Tokyo, Japan)
 Rafael Suzuki, racing driver
 Rodrigo Tabata, footballer, represents Qatar internationally
 Marcus Tulio Tanaka, footballer, represents Japan internationally
 Bruna Takahashi, Table Tennis player
 Augusto Sakai, mixed martial arts fighter
 Daniel Japonês, futsal player
 Igor Fraga, racing driver and e-sports player (Originally from Kanazawa, Ishikawa, Japan)

See also 
 South America Hongwanji Mission
 List of Japanese Brazilians
 Asian Latin Americans
 Brazilians in Japan
 Brazil–Japan relations
 Japanese Peruvians
 Japanese Argentines
 Shindo Renmei

Notes

References 
 Masterson, Daniel M. and Sayaka Funada-Classen. (2004), The Japanese in Latin America: The Asian American Experience. Urbana, Illinois: University of Illinois Press. ; 
 Jeffrey Lesser, A Discontented Diaspora: Japanese-Brazilians and the Meanings of Ethnic Militancy, 1960–1980 (Durham: Duke University Press, 2007); Portuguese edition: Uma Diáspora Descontente: Os Nipo-Brasileiros e os Significados da Militância Étnica, 1960–1980 (São Paulo: Editora Paz e Terra, 2008).
 Jeffrey Lesser, Negotiating National Identity: Immigrants, Minorities and the Struggle for Ethnicity in Brazil (Durham: Duke University Press, 1999); Portuguese edition: Negociando an Identidade Nacional: Imigrantes, Minorias e a Luta pela Etnicidade no Brasil (São Paulo: Editora UNESP, 2001).

Further reading 
 Shibata, Hiromi. As escolas Japonesas paulistas (1915–1945) (Ph.D. dissertation, University of Sao Paulo, 1997).

External links 

 Sociedade Brasileira de Cultura Japonesa 
 Fundação Japão em São Paulo
 Centenário da Imigração Japonesa no Brasil (1908–2008) 
 Tratado de Amizade Brasil-Japão
 Tratado de Migração e Colonização Brasil-Japão
 Site da Imigração Japonesa no Brasil
 Leia sobre os navios de imigrantes que aportaram no Porto de Santos
 Site comemorativo do Centenário da Imigração Japonesa que coleta histórias de vida de imigrantes e descendentes
 Center for Japanese-Brazilian Studies (Centro de Estudos Nipo-Brasileiros)

 
Brazilian
Ethnic groups in Brazil
 
Brazil–Japan relations